There are  137 Grade II* listed war memorials in England, out of over 4,000 listed war memorials. In the United Kingdom, a listed building is a building or structure of special historical or architectural importance; listing offers the building legal protection against demolition or modification, which requires permission from the local planning authority. Listed buildings are divided into three categories—Grade I, Grade II*, and Grade II—which reflect the relative significance of the structure and may be a factor in planning decisions. Grade I is the most significant and accounts for 2.5% of listed buildings, while Grade II accounts for 92%. Grade II* is the intermediate grade accounting for the remaining 5.5%; it is reserved for "particularly important buildings of more than special interest".

A war memorial listed at Grade II* may be of particular artistic interest or accomplishment, of a highly unusual design, or of significant historical interest below that required for Grade I. It is explicitly unnecessary for the architect or sculptor to be well known in order for a memorial to be listed at Grade II*. As part of the commemorations of the centenary of the First World War, Historic England—the government body responsible for listing in England—is running a project with the aim of significantly increasing the number of war memorials on the National Heritage List for England.

This list includes only memorials that are Grade II* listed buildings in their own right. Memorials which are not free-standing—such as a plaque on a church wall—or which form part of the curtilage of a listed building—such as a sculpture within a building—but do not have their own entry on the National Heritage List for England are not included.

War memorials in England take a wide variety of forms and commemorate centuries of conflicts, though memorials to conflicts and the soldiers who fought in them—rather than exclusively commemorating victorious commanders—only started to be commonplace after the Battle of Waterloo in 1815, which ended the Napoleonic Wars. The aftermath of the First World War (1914–1918) produced significantly more memorials than any other single conflict; thus this list is dominated by First World War memorials, many of which were later re-dedicated or added to reflect losses from the Second World War (1939–1945).

The list below also features five memorials to the Second Boer War (1899–1902), to which around 1,000 memorials were built in Britain, four commissioned specifically to commemorate the Second World War, and one each to the Seven Years' War (1756–1763) and the Crimean War (1853–1856).

Memorials

See also

Grade I listed war memorials in England

References

Monuments and memorials in England
 War memorials
Grade II* listed monuments and memorials